Mission San Antonio de Padua is a Spanish mission established by the Franciscan order in present-day Monterey County, California, near the present-day town of Jolon. Founded on July 14, 1771, it was the third mission founded in Alta California by Father Presidente Junípero Serra. The mission was the first use of fired tile roofing in Upper California. Today the mission is a parish church of the Diocese of Monterey and is no longer active in the mission work which it was set up to provide.

History

Beginnings of the Mission

Mission San Antonio de Padua was the third Mission to be founded in Alta California, and was located along the very earliest routing of the Camino Real.  This mission was located on a site which was unfortunately somewhat remote from the more reliable water source of what later became known as the Salinas River. In that very early year of the missions, the later more favorable routing of the Camino Real, more closely aligning with the course of the Salinas River, had not yet been discovered or established.

Father Junipero Serra claimed the site on July 14, 1771, and dedicated the Mission to Saint Anthony of Padua. Saint Anthony was born in 1195 in Lisbon, Portugal and is the patron saint of the poor.
Father Serra left Fathers Miguel Pieras and Buenaventura Sitjar behind to continue the building efforts, though the construction of the church proper did not actually begin until 1810. By that time, there were 178 Native Americans living at the Mission, mostly Northern Salinan (Antoniano) but also some Yokuts and Esselen.

By 1805, the number had increased to 1,300, but in 1834, after the secularization laws went into effect, the total number of Mission Indians at the Mission San Antonio was only 150. No town grew up around the Mission, as many did at other installations.

In 1845, Mexican Governor Pío Pico declared all mission buildings in Alta California for sale, but no one bid for Mission San Antonio. In 1863, after nearly 30 years, the Mission was returned to the Catholic Church. In 1894, roof tiles were salvaged from the property and installed on the Southern Pacific Railroad depot located in Burlingame, California, one of the first permanent structures constructed in the Mission Revival Style.

Restoration

The first attempt to rebuild the Mission came in 1903 when the California Historical Landmarks League began holding outings at San Antonio. "Preservation and restoration of Mission San Antonio began. The Native Sons of the Golden West donated $1,400. Tons of debris were removed from the interior of the chapel.  Breaches in the side wall were filled in."
Unfortunately, the earthquake of 1906 seriously damaged the building. In 1928, Franciscan friars held services at San Antonio de Padua. It took nearly 50 years to completely restore the Mission. The State of California is requiring a $12–15 million earthquake retrofit that must be completed by 2015, or the mission will be closed. As of 2011, there were 35 private families keeping the mission open. There is an active campaign to raise funds for the retrofit.

Current use of the old San Antonio Mission
Despite its being still referred to as a mission, the Mission San Antonio de Padua is no longer active in Catholic missions and has become more focused as a parish church, fundraiser location, and tourist attraction. In 2005, the Franciscan Friars turned over the mission's caretaking and ownership to the Diocese of Monterey. Under the leadership of the Diocese of Monterey, Mission San Antonio de Padua transformed into a Catholic parish which also hosts group gatherings, gift shops and a museum with picnic grounds.

Present day 

Historians consider the Mission's pastoral location in the valley of the San Antonio River along the Santa Lucia Mountains as an outstanding example of early mission life.

The mission is surrounded by the Fort Hunter Liggett Military Reservation, which was acquired by the U.S. Army from the Hearst family during World War II to train troops. This fort is still actively training troops today.

Mission San Antonio de Padua is one of the designated tour sights of the Juan Bautista de Anza National Historic Trail.

As of 2013, Franciscan Friar Jeff Burns OFM, is in charge of the Mission.

In popular culture
 The 1965 horror film Incubus was partly filmed at the Mission.  The writer and director, Leslie Stevens, concerned that the Mission authorities would not allow the film to be shot there because of the subject matter, concocted a cover story that the film was called Religious Leaders of Old Monterey, and presented a script that was about monks and farmers.  He was helped in this deception by the fact that the film was shot entirely in Esperanto.
 The Mission was featured by Huell Howser in Road Trip Episode 147

See also

 The Hacienda (Milpitas Ranchhouse) – the nearby Mission Revival Style guest-ranch house [now hotel] built in 1930 by W.R. Hearst.
 Juan Bautista de Anza National Historic Trail
 List of Spanish missions in California
 List of tourist attractions in Monterey County, California
 Mission Nuestra Señora de la Soledad – next mission located north
 Mission San Miguel Arcángel – next mission located south
 Spanish missions in California
 USNS Mission San Antonio (T-AO-119), a Buenaventura-Class fleet oiler built in 1944

Further reading

References

Bibliography

Notes

External links

 Mission San Antonio de Padua official website
 Fort Hunter Liggett official website
 Monterey County Historical Society
 Early photographs, sketches of Mission San Antonio de Padua, via Calisphere, California Digital Library
 Early History of the California Coast, a National Park Service Discover Our Shared Heritage Travel Itinerary
 Indigenous educators fight for an accurate history of California
 Official U.S. National Park Service Juan Bautista de Anza National Historic Trail website
 

San Antonio De Padua
1771 in Alta California
Churches in Monterey County, California
Museums in Monterey County, California
History museums in California
Religious museums in California
1771 establishments in Alta California
Religious organizations established in 1771
Roman Catholic churches completed in 1810
History of Monterey County, California
California Historical Landmarks
Churches on the National Register of Historic Places in California
Roman Catholic Diocese of Monterey in California
Salinan people
Santa Lucia Range
National Register of Historic Places in Monterey County, California
Junípero Serra
19th-century Roman Catholic church buildings in the United States